Phase separation is the creation of two distinct phases from a single homogeneous mixture.  The most common type of phase separation is between two immiscible liquids, such as oil and water. Colloids are formed by phase separation, though not all phase separations forms colloids - for example oil and water can form separated layers under gravity rather than remaining as microscopic droplets in suspension.

Phase separation in cold gases 
A mixture of two helium isotopes (helium-3 and helium-4) in a certain range of temperatures and concentrations separates into parts. The initial mix of the two isotopes spontaneously separates into ^{4}He-rich and {}^3He-rich regions. Phase separation also exists in ultracold gas systems. It has been shown experimentally in a two-component ultracold Fermi gas case. The phase separation can compete with other phenomena as vortex lattice formation or an exotic Fulde-Ferrell-Larkin-Ovchinnikov phase.

See also 
 Biomolecular condensate
 Colloid
 Phase diagram
 Spinodal decomposition
 Cahn–Hilliard equation

References

Further reading 

 

Equilibrium chemistry
Solvents
Condensed matter physics